Depressaria ruticola is a moth in the family Depressariidae. It was described by Hugo Theodor Christoph in 1873. It is found in North Africa (Tunisia), Iran, Palestine, Turkmenistan, Uzbekistan, Tajikistan, as well as the United Arab Emirates.

The larvae feed on Haplophyllum tuberculatum.

Subspecies
Depressaria ruticola ruticola
Depressaria ruticola arabica Lvovsky, 2009 (United Arab Emirates)

References

Moths described in 1873
Depressaria
Moths of Africa
Moths of Asia